, short for , is a Japanese four-panel manga series written and illustrated by Kōtarō Kosugi. The manga was serialized in Ichijinsha's Manga 4-Koma Palette magazine starting with the October 2011 issue. An anime television series adaptation animated by Feel aired between July and September 2014, with three original video animation episodes released between September 2014 and June 2016.

Plot
As the girls use their talent to promote Nagarekawa and their businesses, they are joined by Yui Mikoze, who acts as the local mascot, and Mirai Nazukari, who serves as Yui's substitute.

Characters

A first-year student at Nagarekawa High School who winds up becoming a Locodol after being recruited by her uncle. She is generally the most level-headed member of the group, and worries about all sorts of things related to her job. Her nervousness on screen often results in her stuttering and mispronouncing her name as "Nanyako".

Nanako's partner in Nagarekawa Girls is a blond-haired second-year student at Nagarekawa High. She is described as someone who "seems perfect, but ends up being airheaded". She comes from a wealthy family, and has lived by herself in an apartment since entering high school. She ponders studying abroad after high school. Her grandfather was the town's former mayor. She is very fond of Nanako, and was inspired by the latter's kindness to help others.

 

A third-year student at Nagarekawa High School who works alongside them as the mascot character, . Her brown hair is styled in a short ponytail. She is particularly athletic, able to perform various acrobatic feats in her costume despite its weight. She plans to use her savings from her locodol activity to enroll in a voice acting school.

A first-year student at Nanako and Yukari's school who is hired as a substitute Uogokoro-kun to lighten Yui's workload. She is a capable performer in the school's drama club, but is generally shy otherwise.

The Nagarekawa Girls' manager who secretly uses pictures she takes at events for her own fansite.

 Nanako's classmate with short burgundy-colored hair and two braids.

 Nanako's classmate with the blonde hair.

 Nanako's classmate with the ponytail.

 Yukari's cousin and classmate.

Nanako's uncle (mother's brother) who is on the city council. He is the one responsible for recruiting the Locodols and was their previous manager before Saori was hired. He picks his niece to be a locodol because she is average in appearance and has a safe, non-scandalous character. At the end of the anime television series, he reschedules the girls' appearance at their local city festival so that they can attend after the Locodol festival goes long.

Nanako's father.

Nanako's mother. She has a part-time job as a cashier.

  

 The Awa Awa Girls (stylized as AWA2GiRLS), are a locodol group from Tokunami City. Having won the Locodol Festival the previous year, the group has made many national TV appearances. However, after meeting the Nagarekawa Girls, they realize the importance of representing their hometown.

Media

Manga
Futsū no Joshikōsei ga Locodol Yattemita is a four-panel comic strip manga written and illustrated by Kōtarō Kosugi. It originally appeared in Ichijinsha's Manga 4-Koma Palette magazine between the October and December 2011 issues, and then later began serialization with the April 2012 issue. The first tankōbon was published by Ichijinsha on January 22, 2013, and ten volumes have been published as of April 21, 2022. A special edition of the fifth volume was released bundled with a drama CD.

Anime
A 12-episode anime television series produced by Feel aired on TBS between July 4, 2014 and September 18, 2014 and was simulcast outside of Asia by Crunchyroll. An original video animation episode was included on the first Blu-ray Disc/DVD volume released on September 24, 2014 and was streamed on Crunchyroll from December 3, 2014. The theme songs were released on July 30, 2014, with an appearance by Miku Ito at Nagareyama which the fictional town of Nagarekawa is based on. A character single with insert songs was released on August 27, 2014. Additional OVA episodes were released on December 24, 2015 and June 22, 2016.

Episode list

OVA episode list

Home release
The series was released to DVD and Blu-ray format in seven volumes. The first volume contains a full-length OVA special and six illustrated cards. In North America, Sentai Filmworks released the 12-episode series and an OVA as a boxset in Japanese with English subtitles.

Notes

References

External links
  
 

2014 anime television series debuts
Anime and manga mascots
Anime series based on manga
Comedy anime and manga
Crunchyroll anime
Feel (animation studio)
Ichijinsha manga
Japanese idols in anime and manga
Seinen manga
Sentai Filmworks
TBS Television (Japan) original programming
Yonkoma